Between 1917 and 1930 approximately 300 km of military and industrial narrow-gauge railways were built at the gauge of  and   or Bosnian gauge, built by Austria-Hungarians and Italians,
intending to create a through route from Skopje and Tetovo to the Adriatic coast of Albania. None of these railways remained intact.

Overview
 
 Shkoder–Vlorë
 Lezhë–Velipoje
 Ishem–Tiranë
 Rrogozhinë–Strmen
 Lushnjë–Berat
 50 km of  gauge line, built 1917-1918 and destroyed 1918.
  gauge private mineral lines in the Patok and Sukth area. 1930s and 1940s.
 Military line between Shkozet and Lekaj during World War II, converted to standard gauge after 1945, being the first standard-gauge line in Albania.
 From Vlorë an inland line was built for bitumen traffic by the Societa Italiana delle Miniere di Selenizza (SIMS).
 North from Vlorë an inland line was built serving salt flats at Narte, now closed. The railway used three Lyd2 locomotives.
 Struga via Tetovo to Skopje for the chrome ore mine in Pogradec. (Partly in North Macedonia, closed.)

See also
 Rail transport in Albania
 History of rail transport in Albania

References

Narrow gauge railways in Albania